Presidential elections were held in Poland on 28 June 2020. As no candidate received a majority of the vote, a second round was held on 12 July, in which incumbent president Andrzej Duda, running with the support of Law and Justice, faced off against Civic Platform vice-chairman and Mayor of Warsaw Rafał Trzaskowski. Results from the second round of voting, announced by the National Electoral Commission (PKW) on 13 July, indicated that Andrzej Duda had won with 51.03% compared to Rafał Trzaskowski's 48.97%.

The first round of voting was due to be held on 10 May 2020, but was postponed due to the COVID-19 pandemic in Poland. On 6 May 2020, the Agreement party, which was in a governing alliance with the leading Law and Justice party and was opposed to pursuing the original election date, reached an arrangement to set new dates for the election. The following day, the PKW declared that the election would not be able to take place on 10 May 2020. On 3 June 2020, the Marshal of the Sejm, Elżbieta Witek, ordered the first round of the election to be held on 28 June 2020 and scheduled the second round on 12 July 2020.

According to the OSCE's Office for Democratic Institutions and Human Rights, the public broadcaster TVP "failed in its legal duty to provide balanced and impartial coverage" and "acted as a campaign vehicle for the incumbent".

Electoral system
The President of Poland is directly elected using a two-round system for a five-year term, with a two-term limit. Andrzej Duda's first term expired on 6 August 2020 when he reaffirmed his oath of office before the National Assembly, a joint session of the Sejm and Senate and began his second term.

Pursuant to the provisions of the Constitution, the president must be elected by an absolute majority of valid votes. If no candidate succeeds in passing this threshold in the first round, a second round of voting is held with the two candidates who received the largest shares of the vote.

In order to be registered to contest the election, a candidate must be a Polish citizen, be at least 35 years old on the day of the first round of the election, and have collected at least 100,000 voters' signatures by 10 June 2020 at midnight.

Polls opened on election day at 07:00 CEST and closed at 21:00 CEST (UTC+2).

COVID-19, election timing, and controversy

The election was originally scheduled for 10 May 2020, which caused extreme political controversy related to the COVID-19 pandemic. Many candidates, constitutionalists, and even politicians from the ruling coalition criticized the government's plan of holding the election as originally scheduled during the pandemic. As a compromise, the Agreement political party proposed lengthening the president's term by two years, which was supported by the Minister of Health, Łukasz Szumowski. This was rejected by the opposition. The main opposition party, Civic Platform, wanted the election to be held in May 2021. The ruling conservative party Law and Justice also wished to change the electoral rules and to organize the election by postal voting only. Changing election rules less than six months prior to voting was ruled to be unconstitutional by the Constitutional Tribunal in 2011. Voting only by post is considered unconstitutional by some including Polish Supreme Court in a non-binding opinion.

Email requests by Poczta Polska for private data
At 02:26 early in the morning on 23 April, every Polish mayor and city council president received an anonymous, unsigned e-mail from Poczta Polska (Polish Post) saying that they were required to deliver the private data of 30 million Polish citizens including their PESEL (national identification number), date of birth, address, and other private data in a .txt file format lacking any passwords or security. Many Polish mayors and city council presidents, lawyers, and other citizens criticized the order to provide such private data, stating that the order violated the GDPR and Polish Law, since the legal act referred to in the email had no legal validity; it concerned a bill that was still undergoing legislative procedures. Citizens and other officials stated their intention to file a lawsuit to the prosecutor's office about the possibility of crimes being committed by the government-run Poczta Polska and by the politicians responsible for the regulation.

Electoral cards leakage
On 29 April 2020, 11 days before the planned election date, election candidate Stanisław Żółtek presented a copy of an electoral ballot at a press conference. The copies contained the names of all the candidates and other forms to be filled by voters. Żółtek said that he received the ballots from workers of one of the companies that was printing and preparing electoral documents. Poczta Polska notified the Internal Security Agency about the leak. As of 2 May 2020, Polish law did not authorise Poczta Polska to organise postal voting except in a small number of special cases.

Presidential election boycott
On 30 April 2020, three former Polish presidents and six prime ministers called for a boycott of 2020 presidential election, on the grounds that the election would be unconstitutional and could not guarantee the confidentiality of voters.

Election day change
On 6 May, Jarosław Gowin, the leader of Agreement, and Jarosław Kaczyński, the leader of Law and Justice struck an agreement to move the election. The two parties had earlier been engaged in a political struggle over whether the election should proceed in May.

On 7 May, the Sejm approved legislation for the election to be held via postal ballot. The same day, PKW announced that "The current legal regulation deprived the National Electoral Commission of the instruments necessary to perform its duties. In connection with the above, the National Electoral Commission informs voters, election committees, candidates, election administration and local government units that voting on 10 May 2020 cannot take place."

The movement of the election day was met with support and opposition from both the "anti" and "pro" Law and Justice spheres of Polish politics. An opinion poll for Rzeczpospolita gauged public support for the Gowin-Kaczyński agreement at 43.5%, with 36.3% being against, and the rest undecided.

Judgment of WSA court
On 15 September 2020, the Voivodship Administrative Court in Warsaw judged that the decision of Prime Minister Mateusz Morawiecki to hold the May elections exclusively through mail-in voting was "[a] gross violation of the law and was issued without [legal] grounds" and violated article 7 of the Polish Constitution, article 157, paragraph 1 and article 187, paragraph 1 and 2 of the Electoral Code. The opposition demanded Morawiecki's resignation.

Candidate selection

The following candidates had been nominated by parties represented in the Sejm.

Law and Justice / United Right
Incumbent President Andrzej Duda was eligible to run for a second term. On 24 October 2019, in an open letter to the elected members of the Sejm and Senate, PiS chairman Jarosław Kaczyński announced that the party will strongly support Andrzej Duda in next year's presidential election. In the first round he won a plurality of 43.5% and went on to face challenger Rafał Trzaskowski in the second round in which he won re-election with 51.03% of the vote.

Nominee:

Civic Platform / Civic Coalition
Donald Tusk was widely expected to make a comeback in Polish politics and to run for President, all the more so given that his European office expired at the end of 2019. However, in November 2019, he announced he would not run for the Polish Presidency, citing that he has "a bag of difficult, unpopular decisions since prime minister" that would burden his candidacy. He is said to have been advised against a run by private opinion polls. He decided to run instead for the leadership of the European People's Party. As a result, party leader Grzegorz Schetyna decided to hold a convention in order to nominate a candidate for president. The primary was won by Małgorzata Kidawa-Błońska.

Małgorzata Kidawa-Błońska resigned her candidacy on 15 May 2020 under pressure of falling poll numbers and her own party. After this, Rafał Trzaskowski became the new candidate of the Civic Coalition. He managed to receive over 1.6 million signatures, securing his eligibility to run in the election. After receiving 30.46% of the vote in the first round he was defeated by the incumbent Andrzej Duda in the second round, winning 48.97% of the vote.

 Nominee:

Ran, but withdrew before the election
Małgorzata Kidawa-Błońska – Deputy Marshal of the Sejm

Declared, but lost at the primary convention:
Jacek Jaśkowiak – Mayor of Poznań.

Declined:
Donald Tusk – President of the European Council, former Prime Minister of Poland, and a candidate in 2005. 
Radosław Sikorski – Former Marshal of the Sejm, former Minister of Foreign Affairs, and a candidate in primary in 2010. Later expressed interest to run after Kidawa-Błońska resigned, but was not considered by party leadership, which claimed to have chosen Trzaskowski 'unanimously'.
Bartosz Arłukowicz – Former Minister of Health.
Tomasz Grodzki – Marshal of the Senate of Poland.

Polish Coalition
In December 2019, PSL chairman Władysław Kosiniak-Kamysz announced that he would be launching a campaign for president.

Declined
Paweł Kukiz – Leader of Kukiz'15, MP, and candidate in 2015.

The Left
At the beginning of January 2020, Włodzimierz Czarzasty said that The Left would nominate Robert Biedroń.

Declined
Adrian Zandberg – MP, co-leader of Lewica Razem, and co-chairman of The Left.

Confederation Liberty and Independence
The party held an open primary, a first in Polish politics. The 2019–20 Confederation presidential primary was modeled after the primary voting model common in the United States. Krzysztof Bosak was nominated during the final round of voting held at the convention in Warsaw on 18 January.

Nominee:

 Declared, but lost in the primary election: 

Konrad Berkowicz – MP, and vice-chairman of KORWiN.
Grzegorz Braun – MP, and chairman of KKP.
Artur Dziambor – MP, and vice-chairman of KORWiN.
Janusz Korwin-Mikke – MP, and chairman of KORWiN.
Paweł Skutecki – Former MP from Kukiz'15.
Krzysztof Tołwiński – Former MP from Law and Justice.
Jacek Wilk – Former MP from KORWiN.
Magdalena Ziętek-Wielomska – Lawyer, philosopher, publicist and author, wife of Adam Wielomski.

Other candidates
These are candidates who collected the necessary 100,000 signatures supporting their candidacy to run, but were not supported by parties in the Sejm:

Rejected candidates
These following candidates made electoral comitties but failed to submit 100,000 signatures supporting their run by the 26 March deadline:

Piotr Bakun – Economist
Marcin Bugajski – Political scientist 
Roland Dubowski – President of the Association of Heirs of Polish War Veterans of the Second World War
Artur Głowacki – Businessman 
Sławomir Grzywa – Leader of "Sami Swoi" ("All Good Friends")
Wiesław Lewicki – Chairman of "Normalny Kraj" ("Normal Country")
Andrzej Dariusz Placzyński – Businessman 
Leszek Samborski – Former Member of the Sejm
Grzegorz Sowa – Businessman associated with 1Polska.pl
Romuald Starosielec – Journalist supported by "Unity of the Nation"
Paweł Świtoń – Businessman 
Krzysztof Urbanowicz – Political activist 
Andrzej Voigt – Businessman 
Jerzy Walkowiak – Political activist

First round political debates
Newsweek – 15 June 2020 (cancelled)
TVP Info – 17 June 2020, 21:00; moderated by Michał Adamczyk.
TVN24 – 19 June 2020 (cancelled)
Polsat News – 22 June 2020 (cancelled)
Onet – 24 June 2020 (cancelled)

Second round political debates
Duda and Trzaskowski both refused to take part in debates at each other's preferred media outlet and a proposal from Duda and supported by Trzaskowski to hold a joint debate hosted by TVP, Polsat and TVN was rejected by TVP Director Jacek Kurski.
TVN, TVN24, Onet and WP joint debate – 19:25 (UTC+2), 2 July 2020 (cancelled by Duda's withdrawal)
TVP Townhall debate - 21:00 (UTC+2), 6 July 2020 (only Duda appeared)
Joint debate with more than 15 newsrooms, organized by Trzaskowski staff, announced the day before – 20:30 (UTC+2), 6 July 2020 (only Trzaskowski appeared)

Opinion polls

First round

Second round

Results

As there was no outright winner in the first round, the top two candidates - Andrzej Duda and Rafał Trzaskowski - advanced to the second round. Szymon Hołownia and Krzysztof Bosak placed third and fourth respectively. Władysław Kosiniak-Kamysz and Robert Biedroń both underperformed expectations taking the fifth and sixth place.

In the second round, there was a close race between Duda and Trzaskowski. Duda had a slight lead in 9:00 pm exit polls which gave him 50.4% of the vote to Trzaskowski's 49.6%. This was within the 2% margin of error leading to the pollster Ipsos announcing the race to be too close to call. Duda's vote share eventually amounted to 51.03%, securing his reelection.

Reactions
After voting had ended, Andrzej Duda invited Rafał Trzaskowski to the Presidential Palace to "shake hands" and "end the campaign". Trzaskowski rejected and said that they could meet after announcing the official election results. The next day, Trzaskowski congratulated Duda on his victory.

US President Donald Trump, President of the European Commission Ursula von der Leyen, NATO Secretary General Jens Stoltenberg, Lega Nord leader and former Italian Minister of the Interior Matteo Salvini, Lithuanian President Gitanas Nausėda, UK Prime Minister Boris Johnson, Hungarian Prime Minister Viktor Orbán, Czech President Miloš Zeman, Slovak President Zuzana Čaputová, and Ukrainian President Volodymyr Zelensky congratulated Duda on his victory.

Observers viewed the election results as illustrating a divided Polish society. They also predicted that PiS would continue pursuing its policies in a number of areas and clashing with the EU. Duda performed strongest among older, rural,low educated and eastern voters.

Elections challenged

The Civic Platform party challenged results of the elections to the Polish Supreme Court, alleging irregularities and biased coverage by the state television. The appeal includes complaints from 2,000 people, containing accusations of problems with voter registry, ballot papers not being sent in time as well as issues with voting abroad. The TVP public broadcaster did not broadcast a single meeting of Trzaskowski with voters. Press.pl, a media-monitoring service, found that, between 3 and 16 June, nearly 97% of Wiadomości news stories devoted to Duda were positive while almost 87% of those on Trzaskowski were negative.

The Supreme Court ruled the election valid, stating that doubts about the television's honesty notwithstanding, TVP was not the only media source available for voters, and that voters were free to choose what media to watch.

Office for Democratic Institutions and Human Rights report
The OSCE's Office for Democratic Institutions and Human Rights investigated the election and found that it was "administered professionally despite the lack of legal clarity." The ODIHR also reported that the presidential campaign "was characterized by negative and intolerant rhetoric further polarizing an already adversarial political environment. [...] the TVP [public broadcaster] failed in its legal duty to provide balanced and impartial coverage. Instead, it acted as a campaign vehicle for the incumbent and frequently portrayed his main challenger as a  threat to Polish values and national interests. Some of the reporting was charged with xenophobic and anti-Semitic undertones."

Notes

References

External links

 
Presidential
Poland
President
President
Presidential elections in Poland